The St Dogmaels television relay station is a broadcasting and telecommunications facility located just above the village of St Dogmaels in Pembrokeshire, Wales, about 2 km to the south west of the town of Cardigan, in neighbouring Ceredigion(). It was originally built by the IBA as a 625-line analogue UHF television relay, entering service in early 1978. Since then it has been converted to transmit the main three multiplexes of the DVB-T digital television system.

The builders of this UHF relay chose not to re-use a nearby existing site with a  lattice tower built by the BBC in 1967 as a relay for the 405-line VHF TV system. This despite it being only about 1.5 km to the south west and on higher ground.

The site has a self-standing tower erected on land that is itself about 100 meters above sea level. The television broadcasts primarily cover St Dogmaels itself plus the town of Cardigan and the upper estuary of the Teifi river.

The transmissions from this relay come off-air from the Preseli transmitter about 20 km to the south.

Services listed by frequency

Analogue television

Early 1978 - 1 November 1982
At the time this relay was built, the UK only had three UHF networks.

1 November 1982 - 19 August 2009
The new Channel 4 network arrived in 1982. Being in Wales, St Dogmaels carried the Welsh variant S4C.

Analogue and digital television

19 August 2009 - 16 September 2009
The digital switchover started on this relay's parent transmitter at Preseli. BBC Two Wales was shut down. ITV1 Wales moved to the old BBC Two Wales frequency, freeing up channel 23 which then became this site's first digital transmission.

Digital television

16 September 2009 - present
With the completion of the digital switchover at Preseli on 16 September, all analogue television from this site ceased forever. The site now only delivers DVB-T digital television.

See also
List of masts
List of radio stations in the United Kingdom
List of tallest buildings and structures in Great Britain

References

External links
 The Transmission Gallery: Photographs and Information

Buildings and structures in Pembrokeshire
Transmitter sites in Wales